Arnold Künzli (20 June 1832, in Murgenthal – 9 November 1908) was a Swiss politician and President of the Swiss National Council (1879/1880).

External links 
 
 

1832 births
1908 deaths
People from Zofingen District
Swiss Calvinist and Reformed Christians
Free Democratic Party of Switzerland politicians
Members of the National Council (Switzerland)
Presidents of the National Council (Switzerland)